First Lady or Gentleman of Malawi is the official title held by the spouse of the president of Malawi, an office created in 1964. Malawi's current first lady is Monica Chakwera, who had held the position since June 2020.

Cecilia Kadzamira was known as the "official hostess" of Malawi from 1964 until 1994, as then-President Kamuzu Banda was unmarried. The country's present first gentleman is Justice Richard Banda, who took office in April 2012.

First ladies and gentlemen of Malawi

See also
President of Malawi

References

 
Malawian women in politics
Politics of Malawi
Presidents of Malawi
Malawi politics-related lists
Malawi
Lists of Malawian people